Licking Run is a tributary of Beaver Run in Richland Township and Quakertown in Bucks County, Pennsylvania in the United States.

Course
It passes along the south side of Memorial Park in Quakertown.

Geology
Appalachian Highlands Division
Piedmont Province
Gettysburg-Newark Lowland Section
Brunswick Formation
Beaver Run lies in the Brunswick Formation, a sedimentary rock laid down during the Jurassic and the Triassic, consisting of mudstone, siltstone, and green, brown, and reddish-brown shale. Mineralogy includes argillite and hornfels.

Crossings and Bridges
 West Pumping Station Road
 Kelly Drive
 Sunshine Drive
 Golden Gate Drive
 West Mill Street
 North Main Street (California Road)
 North 9th Street
 North Main Street
 Pennsylvania Route 212 (North Hellertown Avenue)
 North Ambler Street
 North Penrose Street (pedestrian bridge)
 Erie Road

References

Rivers of Bucks County, Pennsylvania
Rivers of Pennsylvania
Tributaries of Tohickon Creek